The Richard Outwater House is located in East Rutherford, Bergen County, New Jersey, United States. The house was built in 1821 and added to the National Register of Historic Places on January 9, 1983.

See also

 National Register of Historic Places listings in Bergen County, New Jersey

References

External links

East Rutherford, New Jersey
Houses completed in 1821
Houses in Bergen County, New Jersey
Houses on the National Register of Historic Places in New Jersey
National Register of Historic Places in Bergen County, New Jersey
New Jersey Register of Historic Places